Geissorhiza monanthos  is a Geissorhiza species found growing on sandy slopes in Western Cape, South Africa.

References

External links

monanthos
Endemic flora of South Africa